June 5 - Eastern Orthodox Church calendar - June 7

All fixed commemorations below celebrated on June 19 by Orthodox Churches on the Old Calendar.

For June 6th, Orthodox Churches on the Old Calendar commemorate the Saints listed on May 24.

Saints
 Saint Justus, Bishop of Alexandria (130)
 Virgin-martyrs Archelais, Thecla, and Susanna, beheaded at Salerno (293)  (see also: January 18 - West)
 Five Virgin-martyrs:
 Valeria, Kyria, Martha, Mary and Marcia, of Caesarea in Palaestina, martyred for refusing to sacrifice to idols.  (see also: June 7)
 Martyr Gelasius, by beheading.
 Martyrs Amandus, Amantius, Alexander, Lucius, Alexander, Alexandria, Donatus, and Peregrinus at Noviodunum (Niculitel) (320)
 Venerable Amon (or Anoub), the Standard-bearer, renowned ascetic of the Egyptian desert at Raithu (4th century)
 Venerable Bessarion the Great, Wonderworker of Egypt (4th-5th century)
 Venerable Hilarion the New, Abbot of the Dalmatian Monastery at Constantinople (845)
 Venerable Attalus the Wonderworker.
 Venerable Photius, monk.

Pre-Schism Western saints
 Saint Romulus of Fiesole, a disciple of the Apostle Peter, martyred in Florence under Domitian (c. 81-96)
 Martyrs Artemius, Candida and Paulina, at Rome (302)
 Saint Vincent of Bevagna, first Bishop of Bevagna in Umbria in Italy, martyred under Diocletian (303)
 Martyrs Amantius, Alexander and Companions, at Noyon in France.
 Saint Ceratius (Cérase), Bishop of Grenoble in France (c. 455)
 Saint Eustorgius II, Bishop of Milan in Italy, Confessor (518)
 Saint Jarlath (Iarlaithe mac Loga), first Bishop of Tuam, founder of the monastery of Cluain Fois, Ireland (c. 540)
 Saint Alexander, Martyr-Bishop of Fiesole in Italy (590)
 Saint Gudwal (Curval), Welsh Bishop and Confessor and Abbot of 188 monks (6th century)
 Saint Cocca (Cucca, Cuach), patron-saint of Kilcock on the borders of Cos. Meath and Kildare in Ireland.
 Saint Claudius of Besançon (Claude), Gaul (699)
 Saint John of Verona, the successor of St Maurus in Verona in Italy (7th century)

Post-Schism Orthodox saints
 Saint Jonah, Bishop of Perm (1470)  (see also: January 29 )
 Saint Paisius of Uglich, Abbot (1504)
 Saint Jonah of Klimetzk, founder of Klimets Monastery, Olonets (1534)

New martyrs and confessors
 New Hiero-confessor Raphael (Sheichenko), Hieromonk of Optina Monastery (1957)

Other commemorations
 Uncovering of the relics of Venerable Barlaam of Khutyn, founder of Khutyn Monastery, Novgorod (c. 1452), (see also: November 6 )
 Commemoration of the miracle of Archangel Michael, at Alexandria.
 Icon of the Mother of God of Pimen (1381 or 1387)
 Uncovering of the relics of blessed martyr Basil of Mangazea (1602)  (see also: March 22 - Feast; and May 10 - Translation of Relics ) 
 Repose of Eldress Raisa of Serafimovich village near Volgograd (1957)
 Repose of Schemanun Macaria of Temkino in the Smolensk region (1993)

Icon gallery

Notes

References

Sources
 June 6/19. Orthodox Calendar (PRAVOSLAVIE.RU).
 June 19 / June 6. HOLY TRINITY RUSSIAN ORTHODOX CHURCH (A parish of the Patriarchate of Moscow).
 June 6. OCA - The Lives of the Saints.
 The Autonomous Orthodox Metropolia of Western Europe and the Americas (ROCOR). St. Hilarion Calendar of Saints for the year of our Lord 2004. St. Hilarion Press (Austin, TX). p. 42.
 The Sixth Day of the Month of June. Orthodoxy in China.
 June 6. Latin Saints of the Orthodox Patriarchate of Rome.
 The Roman Martyrology. Transl. by the Archbishop of Baltimore. Last Edition, According to the Copy Printed at Rome in 1914. Revised Edition, with the Imprimatur of His Eminence Cardinal Gibbons. Baltimore: John Murphy Company, 1916. pp. 165–166.
 Rev. Richard Stanton. A Menology of England and Wales, or, Brief Memorials of the Ancient British and English Saints Arranged According to the Calendar, Together with the Martyrs of the 16th and 17th Centuries. London: Burns & Oates, 1892. pp. 258–259.
Greek Sources
 Great Synaxaristes:  6 ΙΟΥΝΙΟΥ. ΜΕΓΑΣ ΣΥΝΑΞΑΡΙΣΤΗΣ.
  Συναξαριστής. 6 Ιουνίου. ECCLESIA.GR. (H ΕΚΚΛΗΣΙΑ ΤΗΣ ΕΛΛΑΔΟΣ). 
  06/06/2017. Ορθόδοξος Συναξαριστής. 
Russian Sources
  19 июня (6 июня). Православная Энциклопедия под редакцией Патриарха Московского и всея Руси Кирилла (электронная версия). (Orthodox Encyclopedia - Pravenc.ru).
  6 июня по старому стилю / 19 июня по новому стилю. Русская Православная Церковь - Православный церковный календарь на 2016 год.
  6 июня (ст.ст.) 19 июня 2014 (нов. ст.). Русская Православная Церковь Отдел внешних церковных связей. (DECR).

June in the Eastern Orthodox calendar